This is a list of characters in the Cartoon Network animated television series The Secret Saturdays.

Saturday family

Zak Saturday
 Voice Actor: Sam Lerner (in The Secret Saturdays), Ogie Banks (in Ben 10: Omniverse)

Zak Saturday is the 11-year-old (he turns 12 in "Kur" and turns 13 in "Life in the Underground") major character of the show. The son of Doc and Drew Saturday, Zak seeks adventure at every turn, which is easily satisfied by his cryptid-researching family. Zak has an unorthodox upbringing that has taken him around the planet and placed him in the face of danger since the day he was born. Zak was born the same year the Kur Stone was found and  has a special psychic ability to connect with cryptids, allowing him to control their actions to an extent. Tamer cryptids seem to trust him instinctively and even fiercer ones can tell that Zak is different from other humans.

Zak's primary weapon is the Claw, a combination staff/grappling hook which acts as a focusing device for his powers. Zak also seems stronger and more durable than a normal child his age, as he was able to climb a radio tower carrying a full grown man in "The Vengeance of Hibagon" and gets back up immediately after being thrown against a vent in "Black Monday".

For a while, it was believed that if the cryptid Kur was ever unleashed, Zak would be the only one with the power to stop it. However, it was eventually learned that the Kur Stone Doc and Drew discovered before Zak's birth contained Kur's essence. When it was uncovered, the energy was released from the stone and found a new host, namely, the unborn Zak. Despite the Saturdays trying to keep the truth about Zak's nature secret, the other Secret Scientists found out through unexplained means and began pursuing Zak, forcing the Saturdays to go on the run. The Nagas have also sought him, intending to have him embrace his inner nature and become their new master. Following Rani Nagi's attack on Manhattan, Zak and Fiskerton are approached by V.V. Argost, who offers Zak a deal that will "help [him] master his Kur abilities." Zak agreed to the plan, though Argost has informed him that he has his own hidden agenda. Zak later told Doyle to find out as much as he can about Argost's past. During a fight with an Ahuizotl in "The Thousand Eyes of Ahuizotl", Zak discovered that his powers enabled him to sense cryptids without seeing them.

Solomon "Doc" Saturday
 Voice Actor: Phil Morris (in The Secret Saturdays), Bumper Robinson (in Ben 10: Omniverse)

Solomon "Doc" Saturday is the patriarch and the "Indiana Jones"-like character who has spent his whole life studying cryptids. Doc Saturday naturally had black hair but after a fight with a guardian known as Tsul 'Kalu, Doc was shocked by the claw that originally belonged to Kalu, giving him a streak of white hair and blinding him in his right eye. A man who takes science very seriously, Doc is one of the Earth's leading experts in the field of cryptozoology.

Doc started his career on Honey island when he was 12, learning from Dr. Basil Lancaster. He is a supergenius, having built many of the gadgets the family uses. A loving father, he often tries to teach his son Zak responsibility. Doc is trained in fourteen different forms of martial arts. He fights with the Battle Glove, which is able to channel power into his right fist. The four crystals on the knuckles also have individual powers: freezing, heating, shocking, and sonic vibrations. Though his age is not definite, creator Jay Stephens has stated that he "imagined Doc as 40 or so."

Drew Saturday

 Voice Actor: Nicole Sullivan (in The Secret Saturdays), Vanessa Marshall (In Ben 10: Omniverse)

Drew Saturday is the matriarch and the one who "believes in magic," being more prone to accepting things on faith rather than empirical evidence. Drew was born to a family of adventurer-scientists. After her family was scattered during a severe blizzard in the Himalaya, she was raised by monks who may have taught her to believe not everything needs a reasonable/scientific explanation. Years later, she was reunited with her long lost brother, Doyle. She is able to speak 37 different languages which, in many episodes, comes in handy. Drew is always encouraging Zak to try new things like tribal dancing or sand painting, but when there's a risk of danger, Drew gets a little overly protective of her only son. She's a mystic who is well-versed in the Earth's cultures and can blend in anywhere her travels may take her. In 'And Your Enemies Closer', she and Doyle reunited in the Himalayas at the same place that their family was lost. She then learns that it wasn't the blizzard that separated her and Doyle, but an attack on their camp by The Yeti. Much to her shock, she and Doyle discovered that the cryptid that destroyed their family is in fact Argost.

Drew's preferred weapon is the Tibetan Fire Sword that was given to her by the monks, which absorbs light and channels it into potent bursts of flame. Her sword needs light to access the fire; if there is no light source around, it shoots blue flames. In "Food of the Giants" she shows her skill as an expert at wilderness survival. Like Doc, she is a skilled fighter. Though her age is not definite, Jay Stephens stated that he "imagined her as 34 or so."

Fiskerton
 Voice Actor: Diedrich Bader (in The Secret Saturdays), Corey Burton (in Ben 10: Omniverse)

Fiskerton is a seven-foot-tall "gorilla-cat" with glowing red eyes, based on the Fiskerton Phantom. He was adopted by the Saturday family when his home was burned down in Nottinghamshire, England. Although he is the oldest and largest member of the family, Fiskerton is like an innocent brother to Zak. He may be a coward at times, but he is proven to be a great and strong ally to have, willing to risk his life for his new family. He mostly talks in grunts and mumbling which occasionally mimic human speech, though the family is able to understand him regardless. Even though Fiskerton is a cryptid and not human, he and Zak share a brotherly friendship.

Fiskerton has great strength, as he is capable of ripping apart metal bare-handed and hold his own against larger cryptids. His feet are as dexterous as his hands, allowing him to climb things with ease. In "Once More the Nightmare Factory", it is revealed that Fiskerton is a Lemurian, a member of a race of creatures that guard the Earth against Kur and is able to locate Kur through psychic and instinctual means.

Komodo
 Voice Actor: Fred Tatasciore

Komodo is a 250-pound, genetically-altered Komodo dragon with a voracious appetite. He can become invisible and make other objects invisible, which comes in handy for stealth missions. Though for the most part he is very obedient, Komodo's actions are often dictated by his stomach and he will ignore the family for a good meal. Extending from this, Komodo will often pick fights with others to get food, even when his opponent is far larger and stronger. Like a rivalry between a cat and dog, Komodo often fights with Fiskerton. He seems to have a feud with Zon as well, as he attacks her at least twice. Like Fiskerton, Zak sees him as a brother. He also likes to eat Ulraj's kelp necklace, much to Ulraj's disliking.

Zon
 Voice Actor: Fred Tatasciore

Zon, named after the Amazon rainforest where she was found, is a pterosaur who lives in a nest near the Saturday Headquarters, but isn't truly owned by them. The Saturdays anger her by crashing into her nest during the second episode, but she comes to appreciate them after Zak saves her life. She now uses the cliffs where the Saturdays live as her new hunting grounds. Unafraid of humans, she allows Zak to comb her mane and ride her, but resists the family's domestication efforts and refuses to give up the great outdoors. Like Komodo and Fiskerton, Zak sees her as a family member, in this case as a sister. In "Kur, Part 1," Zon is revealed to be aiding Doyle in locating the missing V.V. Argost. She is currently helping Doyle find information about Argost's past.

Doyle Blackwell
 Voice Actor: Will Friedle

Doyle is Zak's biological uncle, Doc's brother-in-law and Drew's long-lost younger brother. He first appears as Van Rook's apprentice in "The Kur Stone". He helps Zak put a tribe of Amaroks back into hibernation in "The Ice Caverns of Ellef Ringnes", starting a stable relationship with him. At first, he and the Saturdays are unaware of any biological relationship between them. In "Van Rook's Apprentice", he changes sides and joins the Saturdays after learning he is Drew's brother and about V.V. Argost's true motives.

Though Doyle is admired by Zak, he and Drew have a small sibling rivalry and at first, he and Doc barely get along at all. Doc is annoyed by Doyle's tendency to show off and is also frustrated by Doyle's chaotic lifestyle, which proves an unfortunate influence on Zak. Doyle resents what seems to him to be constant criticism by Doc of his methods and tactics, as well as what he perceives to be Doc being judgmental of his mercenary trade. Eventually, they make up, as the threat from Argost grows greater and Doc recognizes the potential value of Doyle's unique skills. Doyle is something of a jack-of-all-trades, fighting using a combination of grenades, lasers, as well as hand-to-hand combat. He is strong enough to lift a grown man one-handed and is able to wrestle with cryptids much larger than himself.

As shown in "The Atlas Pin" he's shown to be not entirely reformed as he was willing to go behind Drew's back to gather the pieces of Rani Nagi's Kur relic. It was mostly because of Doyle that Kur was revealed to be Zak as he repaired the relic and brought it into the proximity of Zak at the end of "Kur Rising". Jay Stephens himself has already said that he imagined Doyle to be "28 or so".

In "Kur", Doyle, aided by Zon and Van Rook, is looking for the missing V.V. Argost. After finding what seemed to be proof that Argost was dead, he reported his findings to the family. Zak secretly informed him that Argost was indeed still alive and asked him to search for information regarding Argost's past. With Zon and Van Rook continuing to aid him, he tracked down those who had connections to Argost's past, but it proved difficult as they kept not-so-mysteriously disappearing. In 'And Your Enemies Closer', his search led him to the Himalayan monks who had raised Drew after they were separated. Upon reuniting with Drew, she informs him that it was here that they lost their parents. Doyle recalls that he ended up sliding down the slope and wound up in an orphanage, which led to the way he grew up. He then reveals something shocking to Drew: it was not the storm that ruined their family, but an attack from a cryptid called a Yeti. Upon finding the beast's abandoned lair, Doyle and Drew make a shocking revelation: the Yeti who attacked their family, killed their parents, caused them to be separated and grow up in different ways was in fact Argost.

Allies and neutral characters

Leonidas Van Rook
 Voice Actor: Corey Burton

Leonidas Van Rook is a ruthless cryptozoologist who is the ally of V.V. Argost and a rival of Doc Saturday (named after Gerard Butler's Hero of Sparta from the movie 300). Van Rook is interested in proving the existence of cryptids for money. He is very thrifty, almost to a fault. Similar to Doc, he is an inventor and has many high-tech gadgets. He and Drew dated in college, much to her dismay. After Doyle left him, Van Rook hired Abbey Grey. In "Kur", Van Rook admits that he trained Abbey too well because she has taken over the mercenary business from him. He seems to have gotten out of shape between Season 1 and Season 2: Doyle pointed out that he had some extra gut room in his armor and he even admitted he was out of shape while fighting Munya. He has been recruited by Doyle to find V.V. Argost after he found Van Rook working with Ron Bantington. When Doyle and his quest to learn the secrets of Argost's past leads to the Himalayas, they are reunited with Drew, who does not greet Van Rook with open arms, it is also shown that even he is disgusted that Argost only attacked people for sadistic pleasure.

He fought alongside the Saturdays in 'War Of The Cryptids', against Argost's cryptid army. He ultimately sacrifices himself to save Drew Saturday from a blast from her own fire sword when it was taken by Rani Nagi during the final battle at Weirdworld, saying she was the only thing he loved almost as much as money. After Argost was destroyed and his cryptid army retreated, the Saturdays and their friends paid their respects to their old enemy turned friend. Doyle says goodbye by tossing three flowers onto his grave, then takes one away and says "Two is plenty."

Secret Scientists
The Secret Scientists are a group of Earth's greatest minds that specialize in various fields:

Dr. Arthur Beeman
 Voice Actor: Jeff Bennett

Dr. Arthur Beeman is a Secret Scientist who studies aliens and UFOs. However, far from being a conspiracy nut, his obsession is apparently justified as he saved the Earth from invasion by figuring out the 'crop circle code'. Beeman is often blunt and mildly insulting in his speech. Doc and Drew called him in to watch Zak, Fiskerton, Komodo, and Zon while they were away on their anniversary dinner. In 'War Of The Cryptids,' it is found out that he has a recording from the Flute of Gilgamesh. He uses this against Zak and Argost, almost to the point of killing them. He is stopped by Miranda and is never seen again.

Dr. Henry Cheveyo
 Voice Actor: Diedrich Bader

Dr. Henry Cheveyo is another Secret Scientist who held a piece of the Kur Stone. Argost stole it, then used a cryptid parasite to extract the location of the third piece from him. He works at the Mesa Observatory in Arizona. He was seriously wounded when he took the brunt of an explosion meant to kill the Saturdays, but survived.

Dr. Miranda Grey
 Voice Actor: Susan Blakeslee

Dr. Miranda Grey is a Secret Scientist who held a piece of the Kur Stone until Munya stole it. She's an expert at quantum physics and works on particle acceleration in Antarctica with her robot sidekick Deadbolt. She has a gun which can create miniature wormholes, allowing her to physically attack opponents from a distance. She is Abbey Grey's sister and was dissatisfied that she sided with Leonidas Van Rook. In "Kur" Pt. 1, she is one of the scientists after Zak. In the "Thousand Eyes of Ahuizoti," it's revealed that she has been watching Weird World for surveillance. In "War of the Cryptids," Miranda had a change of heart as she saved Zak in the season finale from a copy of the song that would harm Kur. She attends Van Rook's funeral.

Deadbolt
Deadbolt is a robot that is Miranda Grey's sidekick. In "Kur" Pt. 1 and "The Thousand Eyes of Ahuizotl", it assists Miranda in hunting Zak.

It's a recurring joke that in every episode he appears in, he gets destroyed only to come back later new and improved. Miranda also mentions that Dead Bolt costs $37,000,000 to repair.

Dr. Paul Cheechoo
 Voice Actor: Danny Cooksey

Dr. Paul Cheechoo is a Secret Scientist that specializes in cold-climate research. He and a team of experts travel the Earth studying strange geological anomalies. He's currently stationed at Ellef Ringnes. In one episode he mentions he grew up in cold weather and he indirectly reveals at the end of "Where Lies the Engulfer" that he is from Canada. The Saturdays tend to cause, or at least get involved in, ecological disasters when they do any work near him, which he eventually points out with slight annoyance. He also has more of a sense of humor than the other Secret Scientists and seem to be the most friendly with Zak. He attended Van Rook's funeral.

Professor Talu Mizuki
 Voice Actor: Jerry Tondo

Professor Talu Mizuki is a scientist who invented a mind-swapping device for crime lord and philanthropist Shoji Fuzen where Mizuki wanted to use the device to give certain people a new body. When asked to use it to implant the mind of one of Fuzen's men into a Hibagon, he takes the Hibagon's body himself to prevent Fuzen from getting his hands on the Hibagon, which Fuzen sees as a potential superweapon. In the ensuing confrontation, his body is lost in a fire and the mind-swapping device is destroyed. He attempts to take revenge against Fuzen, but is convinced by Doc to let it go. He now lives in a cave lab alongside his white tiger working on rebuilding the device so that he can continue his research. Apparently, he has become a member of the Secret Scientists as was shown in "Eterno" where he helps the other scientists solve the Eterno crisis. In "Kur" Pt. 1, he is one of the scientists after Zak.

White Tiger
This white tiger is the result of Talu Mizuki's mind-swapping project where he swapped it with the mind of his dog. After the accident that caused Talu's mind to be in a Hibagon, the white tiger still remains with Mizuki.

Dr. Pachacutec
Voice Actor: Candi Milo

A member of the Secret Scientists who is seen in "Eterno". She and the other scientists were at the meeting and discovered that the rivers have turned to salt in the Middle East of Arab. She and the other scientists helped Zak, Wadi, and Fiskerton to get the sap from the Methuselah Tree. Once they returned to the surface, Zak accidentally dropped the bottle (that had the sap) and some of the sap then destroyed the salt bonds on Drew. Dr. Pachacutec shows Zak that the sap is breaking Drew's bonds. However, once Eterno quenches his thirst, his body crumbles to pieces of salt. Doc then saw the flower which used to have the sap and said that he'll have Pachacutec analyze it, since if the Scientists were able to synthesize the flower, they might be able to reverse the effects of what Eterno did. Once the sap is synthesized and all of the people are free from their salt bonds, Dr. Pachacutec said that the scientists will deal with the waters that are still salt.

Dr. David Bara
 Voice Actor: Clancy Brown

A member of the Secret Scientists who is seen in "Shadows of Lemuria" and "And Your Enemies Closer".

In his first appearance, he uses his Dream-Time Totem to put Fiskerton to sleep in order to find the motivation behind his instinctual behavior. Argost sends a neural parasite to control Fiskerton. After Drew told David to not let anyone in, she left, but Zak enters the room and attacks Dr. Bara. Dr. Bara tried to put him to sleep, but did not succeed. The parasite then attaches itself to Fiskerton in order to control him, but Fiskerton was fighting back. An army of Fisk-Bots broke in and destroyed the Saturdays' headquarters. After Zak defeated the parasite, the Fisk-Bots used parts of the headquarters that resembles the globe of the diving rod. When the Saturdays head to Antarctica, David Bara said he'll find his way home.

In his second appearance, he was one of the scientists that are trying to capture a Revolving Beast.

Dr. Odele
 Voice Actor: Phil Morris

A member of the Secret Scientists who is specialized in anomalous weather.

In "The Kur Stone", he told Doc that Henry has been fatally wounded by the explosion (that was caused by Argost's firecracker beetles), but said that he'll be alright. He also believes that Argost is heading to Manaus, Brazil. He also suggested the Saturdays to leave Zak with him, while the rest of them get the last piece of the Kur Stone. This made Zak upset, but Doc suggested that Zak will stay with his family.

In "The King of Kumari Kandam", he called the Saturdays to inform them that the citizens of Kumari Kandam attacked him and his people somewhere at the South Indian Ocean.

In "Eterno", he was seen at the meeting with the other scientists.

Ulraj
 Voice Actor: Adam Wylie

The young fish-like prince of Kumari Kandam, whose father was killed in an assault orchestrated by V.V. Argost. He allied with Zak to reclaim his kingdom from V.V. Argost. With help from the Saturdays, Ulraj reclaimed his kingdom, but V.V. Argost and Munya escaped with an ancient and powerful Sumerian medallion which Ulraj stated to be too dangerous to wield.

In "The Underworld Bride," King Ulraj later helped the Saturdays when the Dua'a was trying to take Zon into the Underworld. In that episode, he exhibits the ability to detect electric fields.

In "The Atlas Pin", Ulraj helps stop the Nagas from pulling the Atlas Pin. He has a friendly rivalry with Zak.

In "Life in the Underground" he and Zak both compete for Wadi's affection which turns the friendly competition into a less than friendly one. Ulraj later admits that he doesn't like Wadi, he just doesn't like losing to Zak.

Agent Epsilon
 Voice Actor: Brian Stepanek

Agent Epsilon and his 11-year-old "son" Francis are members of a secret organization loosely allied with the Secret Scientists, though they have their own agenda. Epsilon is usually quite serious and by the book, personifying the "Men in Black" archetype. He also has access to "the files" which is a large database on everyone and everything. He also has a group called his "people" for protection. It is revealed in "The Unblinking Eye" that he and Francis are actually clones of the "perfect agent" their organization found 100 years ago.

Francis
 Voice Actor: Scott Menville

The 11-year-old "son" of Agent Epsilon. Francis is clever and manipulative, just like his "father". Francis wears a shield generator that shocks anyone who tries to touch him without permission. He and Zak have a rivalry, as evident in "The Swarm at the Edge of Space" and "Paris Is Melting". He is a bit jealous of Zak because he has a "normal" family and Francis does not. It was revealed in "The Unblinking Eye" that Francis and Epsilon are clones of a "perfect agent" their organization found 100 years ago thus explaining why he has no mother. Francis also explained that in time he will be given a "Francis" of his own to raise as Epsilon is raising him. He also showed a great disdain and bitterness over this fact, due to the massive amount of pressure it placed upon him. Zak tells him he's in charge of his own destiny and is his own person, not just another clone. Francis understands and allows Zak to escape instead of capturing him as a way to thank him (though he wouldn't admit it).

Maboul
 Voice Actor: Diedrich Bader

Maboul is the father of Wadi and the chieftain of the Hassi who guard the Methuselah Tree (the source of all water on Earth). He disapproves of Wadi's kleptomaniac ways. In "Curse of the Stolen Tiger," he has the Saturdays babysit Wadi while he is away on Hassi business. He is good friends with Drew Saturday. He and Wadi, as well as some members of the Hassi took part in the fight against the cryptids controlled by V.V. Argost.

Wadi
 Voice Actor: Liliana Mumy

Wadi is the daughter of Maboul and Zak's love interest. Wadi is a kleptomaniac, which her father disapproves of (even though after the events of "Eterno", she has vowed to recover stolen property). In "Eterno", she steals a salt crystal which inadvertently awakens the salt creature Eterno. She aids Zak in stopping it, building a love-hate friendship. She later assists the Saturdays in reclaiming a village's stolen blue tiger from Shoji Fuzen, with Wadi helping to defeat him by stealing a component from Shoji's high-tech armor that controls its flight capability. All of Zak's family thought that he has a crush on her due to his being very clumsy around her (which turned out to be true), which he vehemently denies until she admits she thinks he's cute, which he immediately blushes at. She has a peculiar habit of stealing Zak's belt. In the episode "Life in The Underground", Wadi shows that she has a crush on Zak and gives him a kiss on the cheek. She has also copied his idea of "the claw" with a yo-yo shown in "Life in the Underground". Zak also has a crush on her that becomes more obvious in each episode she's there. She is around Zak's age (11-13).

Wadi participated alongside her tribe in "War Of The Cryptids" alongside the rest of the Hassi.

Tsul 'Kalu
A skilled cryptid warrior, known for his devotion to catch his targets no matter what. Years ago he challenged Doc to a fight due to an accident caused by Zak which destroyed an archeological place guarded by him. In the ensuing fight, Doc won but at the cost of a blinded eye and a scar on his face. As a token of honor Tsul 'Kalu gave him his amulet, a claw, which was to be used later on Zak's weapon. In the present he tracked Zak down, having learned that he is Kur and tried to reclaim the amulet, not wanting it to be used for evil purposes. After losing the battle against Zak, he was able to see his true intentions and permitted Zak to use the power of the Claw. He is now an ally of the Saturdays and assisted in the fight against an army of cryptids. In 'And Your Enemies Closer', he helped keep Zak from getting killed by Argost and Munya. He fought and defeated Munya in 'War of the Cryptids.'

Tiacapan
 Voice Actor: Jessica DiCicco

Tiacapan is a young Mexican girl (around 11-12) who is seen in "The Thousand Eyes of Ahuizotl". Her village was terrorized by the monster known as Ahuizotl. She told the Saturdays that Ahuizotl is a nocturnal cryptid and steals the eyes from the living as if Ahuizotl is blind. She even explained that Ahuizotl was resting in its tomb, but awakens for unknown reasons after about 6 months had passed. She also said that her people are using Miranda as a sacrifice to the beast, because they don't want Ahuizotl to steal theirs. Due to feeling that it's wrong to do something like this, Zak explains that people do a lot of things when they're scared. Tica also said there's still time before Miranda gets her eyes taken by the creature. She gives them masks to prevent the Ahuizotl from stealing their eyes. Once they reach to a pyramid, they find Miranda bound and gagged with the Ahuizotl preparing to steal her eyes. Zak, however, uses his powers to battle the beast. He tells Tica to evacuate the villagers. Once Ahuizotl was defeated, the Saturdays decided to leave Miranda in Mexico, until Tica knows that they're all cleared.

Swamp Cryptids
The Swamp Cryptids are a group of 13 hominid cryptids that appeared in "Ghost in the Machine". They live on Honey Island, Louisiana and they seem to be based on the real-life reported ones (although some could be made up). They work for the deceased Basil Lancaster (a friend of Doc).

These cryptids attacked Zak, Komodo, and Fiskerton when they were wandering into the swamp and were nearly eaten by oversized alligators. They also attacked Drew and Doc in the lab, due to believing that they were restarting the project. However, Zak, Komodo, and Fiskerton were captured by Dr. Lee and his scientists and mutated them into a cryptid known as the Saturday Hybrid/Zakermodo. When the cryptid hybrid escapes, the swamp cryptids begin to destroy the lab and Doc and Drew went after him. The Devil Monkey and the Fouke Monster were holding away Doc and Drew as the Lake Worth Monster grabs the Zakermodo until he heard Drew saying "Zak Saturday". The Lake Worth Monster then releases the Saturday Hybrid, heads to one of the cabins, and shows a picture of young Doc/Solomon with the deceased Dr. Basil Lancaster and a message from Lancaster. Once Dr. Lee and the scientists are captured, the cryptids leave the machine alone so Doc and Drew can turn the cryptid hybrid back to Zak, Fiskerton, and Komodo back to normal. The Lake Worth Monster then reveals a radio as Doc turns it on to hear the message from Lancaster.

The message reveals that Basil Lancaster and the other scientists created these cryptids. The cryptids were actually once human beings, but their DNA were mixed with animal DNA. Lancaster knew that what he did was wrong, as he then betrayed Dr. Lee and destroyed enough of their research in order to cripple the project. The cryptids were saved by Lancaster and they went into hiding, but they stayed behind in order to fully destroy the project. Honoring Dr. Lancaster's final request, the Saturdays and the cryptids destroy all that remained of the project.

Momo
Momo is a Bigfoot-like creature with hair covering most of its face.

Bishopville Lizard Man
Bishopville Lizard Man is a reptilian humanoid. In this show, the Bishopville Lizard Man has acid-spitting abilities.

Honey Island Swamp Monster
 Voice Actor: Dee Bradley Baker

In this show, the Honey Island Swamp Monster is a Bigfoot-like creature with the head of a maned monkey, the feet of a crocodile, and the claws of a crab.

Lake Worth Monster
The Lake Worth Monster is a hairy creature that has the head and hooves of a goat. It was the one who showed Doc and Drew the message from Dr. Lancaster and helped to intimidate Dr. Lee and his colleagues into undoing the fusion done to Zak, Fiskerton, and Komodo.

Kinchafoonee Creep
The Kinchafoonee Creep is a bat-headed creature with wild boar-like tusks.

Georgia Pigman
 Voice Actor: Dee Bradley Baker

The Georgia Pigman is a pig-headed ape-like creature.

Bardin Booger
The Bardin Booger is a Bigfoot-like creature.

Man Cat
The Man Cat is a Bigfoot/black panther-like creature.

Devil Monkey
The Devil Monkey is a monkey-like creature with horns.

Green Goon
The Green Goon is an ape-like creature.

Hawley Him
The Hawley Him is a black-furred Bigfoot-like creature.

Mississippi Swamp Ape
The Mississippi Swamp Ape is a "bearded" Bigfoot-like creature.

Fouke Monster
The Fouke Monster is a Bigfoot-like Cryptid.

In "War of the Cryptids", the Fouke Monster was among the cryptids that fought Munya during his invasion of Paris.

Tibetan Monks
 Voice Actors: Phil Morris and Jeff Bennett

A group of monks from the Himalayas. They were mentioned in "Van Rook's Apprentice" and make an actual appearance in "And Your Enemies Closer".

Drew mentioned that after she was separated from her family, the Tibetan monks found her and raised her in their temple. After she got older, the monks gave her a Tibetan Fire Sword.

In "And Your Enemies Closer", Doyle, Zon, and Van Rook visit the Himalayas and they find Drew. The monks arrived and welcomed Drew for returning to the Himalayas. In the temple, the monks were giving them tea. Van Rook was disgusted by the tea and asked how to say "taste like yak vomit" in Tibetan, causing one of the monks to hit him on the head. Doyle was telling Drew that Argost and Munya have captured Baron Finster, but wasn't sure why he abducted the Xing-Xing, but he knew it was also from the Himalayas.

When they went outside, Doyle knew the area where they lost their parents. Drew thought it was the storm, but it was actually a mysterious cryptid that killed them and push Doyle to the village. Doyle thought the Xing-Xing was the creature that attacked his parents. Drew then told Doyle that they never knew that there was a cryptid in the Himalayas. The monks then looked at each other and Drew got upset at them that they knew and never told her. The monks told her that they couldn't bare to add one more nightmare in her troubled sleep. They said that the cryptid is called the Yeti and her parents were not its only victims in those days. They said that they tried to hunt it down countless times, but when they finally found its lair, the beast was gone. They then showed Drew and the others to the Yeti's lair. Doyle was still upset about the "orange Yeti freak" for letting it go. However, one of the monks said that the Yeti doesn't have orange fur, but is pure white with pale blue skin and they suggested it was not the cryptid he saw.

Bud Harger
 Voice Actor: Corey Burton

A logger who owns the Allegheny Mountains as his land. He's seen in "Food of the Giants". He and his three workers decided to make a city by cutting down trees, but one night, a large cryptid called the Allegewi attacked their campsite and abducts two of his workers. Harger called the Saturdays to help him search for his workers. He told Ruby to take the four-wheeler back to base camp and says to her that she'll be safe there. When the Saturdays were caught in strange traps, Harger showed up and also got caught. Abbey said that Harger caused the traps and was having the weapons sabotaged. However, it's later revealed that Abbey was the culprit, who's working for Van Rook (who sold the land to Harger). When the Allegewi attacks and knocks out Abbey, it saw the Saturdays and Harger in the traps. It looked at Abbey's unconscious body and left her, due to believing that she was dead.

When the Allegewi released the Saturdays out of the traps, Harger thought it was letting them go and did not want to eat them. However, it's revealed that the Allegewi is a predatory thing and has to hunt its food. As the man-eating cryptid chases them (with Doyle carrying Abbey and Fiskerton carrying Zon as if her wings are injured), they climbed onto a tree with Drew chopping it with her sword and they seemingly outran the Allegewi. They later cover themselves in mud in order to keep the cryptid from eating them. When Harger offered to rub mud on Doyle, Doyle refuses and "knows what he's made of and it's not the stuff". The Saturdays then found one of Harger's men, Wyatt. As Wyatt explained that Cody is missing, the Allegewi returns.

Later that night, the Saturdays were heading to the Allegewi's cave. While Harger was counting the "gorilla" and the "dino-bird" as one, making nine, which made Fiskerton and Zon (who's carried in a basket) yell at him, Zak warns him to count them separately causing Harger to agree that it makes ten. As Doc and Doyle rescue Cody from the Allegewi, the three head outside with the cryptid chasing them. The group shoot catapults and spears at the Allegewi, which gives Fiskerton and Zon the chance to knock the Allegewi to a large net made of vines with Hickory sap (which was Zak's idea). When they planned to relocate the Allegewi to another location with plenty open land and zero human population, Abbey frees it. As the Allegewi attacks, Abbey tells Doyle and Zak to tell their family that "she's sorry" as she pushes them out of the way and the Allegewi attacks her, causing her and the beast to fall into a chasm, but Abbey doesn't die. With the Allegewi defeated, Harger and his workers head back to their camp.

Ruby, Cody, and Wyatt
 Voice Actors: Kari Wahlgren (Ruby), Phil Morris (Wyatt), Diedrich Bader (Cody)

Three loggers who work for Bud Harger. Two of the workers (Cody and Wyatt) were captured by an Allegewi. When Wyatt escaped from the beast's lair, he led the Saturdays in an attempt to rescue Cody. When they reached the Allegewi's lair, the cryptid tries to catch Cody, who's hiding in a crevice. They managed to rescue him and defeat the Allegewi (thanks to Abbey, who lured it to a chasm).

Dr. Basil Lancaster
 Voice Actor: Fred Tatasciore

A scientist, who was a friend of Doc Saturday when he was young. He was seen in "Ghost in the Machine". He and Doc worked with Dr. Lee and three unnamed scientists with a machine to create cryptids on Honey Island Swamp. However, the project went out of control as the cryptids were mutated humans. He knew his conscience was wrong and it took too long to listen. Dr. Basil Lancaster betrayed Dr. Lee by destroying enough of their research to cripple the project, saved the cryptids and fled to the bayou. As his colleagues went into hiding, he left Honey Island, knowing that the cryptids will destroy the project and the machine that created them. However, as years passed, Lancaster died. However, he did leave Doc a message to reveal what Honey Island was really about.

Honoring Lancaster's final request, the Saturdays and the cryptids destroy all that remained of the project. Dr. Lee and the other three scientists are sent to prison by the US Army. Doc also takes the photo that shows a younger version of him and Lancaster. The message ends that Lancaster knows that Doc is a better man.

Villains
V.V. Argost
 Voice Actor: Corey Burton

V.V. Argost is the series' main villain and the archenemy of the Saturdays. He is the host of V.V. Argost's Weirdworld, a series that made him "the modern master of the bizarre" of the Earth. With an extensive knowledge of cryptids as well as a showy and dramatic personality, Argost's overall goal is the possession of Kur and the power it holds. Having hid his true nature well, Argost is actually a Yeti that had been attacking humans out of enjoyment in the Himalayas and often took items from their camp as souvenirs. According to Jay Stephens, one of the 'souvenirs' Argost had taken from a camp he had attacked was a television, from which he learned to speak English. Argost then resolves to live among humans by influencing them with a television show of his own. Donning a Megatooth shark skin cloak and mask, Argost lived on the streets before acquiring the funding he needed from Baron Finster in return for his scorpion lower body.

In "Kur Rising", Argost takes control of a creature he and the Saturdays believe to be Kur before the monster is defeated and he is taken to safety by Munya when his mask started to cracked after taking enough blows from Zak, who is revealed to be the host of the actual Kur. Throughout the second season, while using Munya to give the Saturdays the notion that he had died, Argost went into hiding before saving Zak from Rani Nagi and offered to help him hone his Kur powers. However, as was revealed in "Legion of Garuda", Argost possesses the flute of Gilgamesh with the intent to extract Zak's power while obtaining an orange ape-like cryptid from his past during the episode "Return of Tsul".

During the episode "And Your Enemies Closer", as Dolye and Drew eventually learn of his true nature and his role in their parents' death in the Himalayas, Argost kidnaps Zak and takes him to an island where he revealed that during the events of "Into The Mouth of Darkness" when he hacked into the Saturdays' airship computer in a search for a means to extract Zak's Kur powers, he learned about the existence of the Saturdays' evil counterparts, the Mondays. The research had Argost realize that Zak Monday is logically the Anti-Kur, so he stole the Smoke Mirror of Tezcatlipoca from the Paris museum to bring the anti-matter Zak into their reality in order to siphon the Anti-Kur into himself. Once the ritual is completed, since he is now immune to Zak's powers, Argost destroys the relics to keep his new powers while revealing his true identity. Soon after, in the series finale "War Of The Cryptids," Argost set his plans into motion, unleashing a gigantic cryptid army all over the Earth. However, his arrogance proves to be his undoing when he siphons Zak's powers in an attempt to amplify his own, having obtained an electronic sound-system that recreated a weaponized version of the Flute Of Gilgamesh. Unable to hear Zak's warning of the danger when it comes to combining matter and anti-matter energies, Argost finds himself imploding from the two Kurs' energies and is presumed dead.

However, it is revealed that in the crossover episode "T.G.I.S" of Omniverse that Argost was actually thrown into a state of anti-matter flux from the Kur energies. But Argost had set up a back-up plan with Dr. Animo in order to be revived through the use of cryptid and alien DNA. But once he was revived, Argost was initially displeased to find his body had been turned into a chimeric amalgamation that gave him the head, torso, and left arm of a Yeti, the horns, wings, hooves, and tail of a Jersey Devil, and a Loch Ness Monster-like head for a right arm instead of a Yeti-like body. But Argost quickly finds his new body is to his advantage when he seeks revenge on Zak and is thrilled to learn that he still has the powers of the anti-matter Kur which allows him to control an army of mutant cryptids with a single thought. Ultimately he is defeated once again through the teamwork of Zak and Ben Tennyson, the later of whom manages to drain Argost's powers.

Munya
 Voice Actor: Fred Tatasciore

Munya is V.V. Argost's servant, injected with the DNA of a Papuan giant spider, enabling him to transform into a half-human/half-Papuan giant spider monster in battles where he has a humanoid form with spider-like legs coming out of his back. In this form, he gains superhuman strength, is able to climb walls, and can fire thick streams of webbing from his mouth. Following Argost's defeat at Antarctica, Munya wrapped up Argost in webbing and made off with him.

In "Kur" Pt. 2, Munya was using a special typewriter called a "text to speech engine" to help promote V.V. Argost's return. After learning that Doyle was searching for his secrets, Argost had Munya hunt down every person that was connected to his past on his orders, including Baron Finister.

In the episode "And Your Enemies Closer", it was shown that Munya had enough cryptid DNA to be controlled by Zak.

In "War of the Cryptids", Munya led an attack on Paris as part of Argost's army only to be defeated by Tsul 'Kalu, shortly after Argost's downfall.

Munya is once again at his master's side upon his revival by Dr Animo in the crossover episode "T.G.I.S" of Ben 10: Omniverse and also confronts Zak when he discovers Animo's lair, but is defeated in the ensuing fight.

Abbey Grey
 Voice Actor: Kari Wahlgren

Once Zak's babysitter, Abbey Grey is an ancient civilization expert and Miranda Grey's sister. She appears in "The Kur Guardian", helping Zak, Doyle, and Fiskerton in learning about Fiskerton's Lemurian roots. She and Doyle begin dating at the end of the episode, only for him to discover in "Food of the Giants" that Van Rook hired her not long after Doyle quit. She admits her feelings for Doyle were real, but still intends to finish the Saturdays off.

In "Kur Pt. 1", Leonidas Van Rook mentioned to Doyle that Abbey Grey took over his business. Later it is revealed that she is much better in the field of mercenary work than Van Rook since not only does she make more money but also is able to buy higher grade equipment due to her not being as much of a cheap skate as her former teacher. Also it's shown that she, like her teacher, has come under the employment of Argost.

Rani Nagi
 Voice Actor: Susan Blakeslee

Rani Nagi is a four-armed Naga and the queen of her race. She can control any type of snake and speak through them. Her species is able to speak and breathe underwater.

When V.V. Argost captures Fiskerton, he calls her in to see if Fiskerton is Kur. She uses a relic forged from Kur's own essence which is said to glow in the presence of its master. When the artifact fails to glow, Argost asks her why the picture of Fiskerton was in Kur's tomb. She identifies him as a Lemurian, saying he can lead Argost to Kur. She then leaves before Doc charges in to face Argost. She later follows Zak, Doyle, Fiskerton, and Abby to Shangri-La in order to learn where Kur is located. After a brutal battle in which she mostly holds her own against the family, she is finally defeated by Fiskerton.

She is seen later in "The Atlas Pin", where she is using her Kur-sensing relic around Kur's tomb, only for it to be stolen by Argost so he can use it to find Kur. She enlists the Saturdays' aid in retrieving her stolen relic by threatening to remove the Atlas Pin should they refuse to comply. Drew, Zak, and Komodo manage to stop her with help from Kumari Kandam, though she and her followers escape capture while Doc, Doyle, Fiskerton, and Zon recovered the artifact. However, when Drew learned that the Nagas were dark mystics, she says the relic must be destroyed which Fiskerton does. However, Doyle covertly recovers the pieces and repairs it. The relic plays a big part in the 1st-season finale as it identifies Zak as Kur.

Rani Nagi and her fellow Nagas returned in the season two premiere "Kur" as the main villains. After it was revealed that Zak is Kur, the Nagas sought him out while calling him their master. Rani attempted to convince Zak to tap into his inner nature and lead all cryptids in a war against humanity. Her attempt was interrupted by the timely arrival of the rest of the family and after a rough battle, they saved Zak and escaped. However, the Nagas had already succeeded in having Zak's power summon the most vicious cryptids from around the planet in a battle against humans. She and the other Nagas lead the army in the name of Kur. During the attack upon Manhattan, Rani Nagi was knocked away by V.V. Argost. Rani Nagi and her Nagas had possession of the Flute of Gilgamesh which Zak and Fiskerton stole. When Zak's life was threatened by Gokul using the Flute of Gilgamesh on him, she and her fellow Nagas helped the Saturdays and the scientists that were after Zak stop Gokul.

In "War of the Cryptids," Rani Nagi and her Nagas side with V.V. Argost after he claims the Anti-Kur powers from Zak Monday. She was responsible for using Drew's sword to attack her only for Leonidas to sacrifice his life by blocking the attack. She was later knocked out by the Saturdays after V.V. Argost imploded.

Shoji Fuzen
 Voice Actor: James Sie

Shoji Fuzen is a Japanese philanthropist who is also Japan's biggest crime lord. He tries to obtain a mind-swapping device invented by Talu Mizuki to transfer the mind of one of his followers into a Hibagon (a large, ape-like cryptid). Mizuki instead transfers his own mind into the creature, then goes on a rampage of revenge against Fuzen. The Saturdays convince Mizuki to abandon his revenge and send Fuzen to jail for his crimes.

He returns in the second season as a Chinese warlord after escaping from prison. He and his henchmen steal a luck-granting blue tiger from a small village. He is also now armed with a samurai-themed suit of high-tech armor, which he uses while engaging the Saturdays. During the battle, Fuzen is knocked off a cliff by Doc after Wadi steals a component from the suit which it needs for flight. It is unknown if Shoji Fuzen survived the fall.

Piecemeal
 Voice Actor: Jess Harnell

Pietro "Piecemeal" Maltese is a criminally-insane chef with an appetite for rare animals. He has a surgically modified jaw made of four metal flaps which can bite through almost anything. He has above-average strength and durability, as he is able to knock out Fiskerton with a single punch and survive a direct blast from Drew's fire sword without injury. He attacks the Saturday household in order to devour Fiskerton, but is repelled by Zak using his mother's fire sword.

In "Target: Fiskerton", he is hired by V.V. Argost to help Leonidas Van Rook capture Fiskerton. Pietro instead tries to eat Fiskerton during the conflict on the train, so Argost uses a neuroparasite to knock him unconscious.

Baron Finster
 Voice Actor: Rob Paulsen

Baron Finster is a half man/half robotic scorpion villain that Doyle once claimed to have fought. In his story, Doyle rescued a Ngani-vatu from him then rode the beast to safety. Doc calls the plausibility of the story into question and it seems likely that Doyle was exaggerating to entertain Zak.

In "Cryptid vs Cryptid," Doyle later fought Baron Finster in the arctic and managed to defeat him and his henchmen, thereby proving that the villain at least does exist. On the Viral website Ten Hero Tusk, there is an egg that was provided by Baron that shows that he is a Cryptozoologist like Van Rook.

In "Into the Mouth of Darkness", Doyle and von Rook capture him to get information about Argost, but he is taken away by Munya. They did manage to find out that Argost designed Baron Finster's robotic scorpion body in exchange for funding for Weird World as well as the fact that Argost was once a very poor man.

The Mondays
The Mondays are the Saturdays' evil antimatter duplicates from a parallel universe, summoned by the Smoke Mirror of Tezcatlipoca. They are not well liked in their reality, most likely being criminals. Each Monday has a distinguishing characteristic that sets them apart from the Saturdays and cause reality to warp when in the presence of their duplicates. The name Monday was given to them by Zak Saturday since, according to him, his double is a "less fun version of a Saturday", hence a Monday.

The Mondays accidentally banish themselves back to their own universe while fighting over the mirror. The Saturdays leave and fail to notice that Zak Monday and Komodo Monday escaping from the mirror while leaving the others behind, even when Drew Monday purposely threatened her son even though he's out of sight and can't hear her. In "Paris is Melting", the evil Zak and Komodo attempt to threaten Zak into retrieving their airship from the antimatter universe following their attack on Dr. Cheechoo, Dr. Lawhorn, and Dr. Grimes. Zak recovers it for them, but makes a deal with the rest of the Monday family while doing so. Zak drains the ship's power with their help before returning, causing it to crash back into the repaired Smoke Mirror of Tezcatlipoca when the evil Zak and Komodo attempt to fly it. They are about to get beaten up by the family they left in the mirror. It is not known if whether or not Doyle has an evil counterpart like the rest of the Saturdays. It's most likely that Monday isn't really their last names, as Zak Monday had asked "Is that what you call us?" in "Paris is Melting", since technically, Zak (Saturday) made up the name. Zak Monday returned in 'And Your Enemies Closer', where Argost tricked him so he could steal his power with the Flute of Gilgamesh. Afterwards, Argost smashed both the flute and Smoke Mirror, trapping the other Mondays in their reality forever.

Zak Monday
 Voice Actor: Sam Lerner

His hair color reversed from Zak Saturday's along with his eyes glowing green when using his power with his Fang weapon, Zak Monday possesses the Anti-Kur power and uses it to drive cryptids insane rather than calming them. While Zak Saturday respects life, Zak Monday disregards it and has shown to be sadistic. Out of all the Monday family members, Zak Monday was the most reoccurring alongside Komodo Monday before they are sent back to their universe.

However in "And Your Enemies Closer" when summoned back to his counterpart's reality in what he later learned was a trap, Zak Monday is killed off when Argost uses the Flute of Gilgamesh to absorb the Anti-Kur spirit from him.

Doc Monday
 Voice Actor: Phil Morris

Solomon "Doc" Monday's scarred eye is on the opposite side and he wears an eye patch over it. He usually speaks in incoherent babbling and has a much lower intellect than his counterpart. As shown in "Paris Is Melting", he has a power glove like Doc's, but it is gray and black, as well as fingerless and left-handed.

Drew Monday
 Voice Actor: Nicole Sullivan

Drew Monday has a long, prehensile tongue, but is otherwise similar to her counterpart. She is more rationally scientific than her counterpart. Whereas Drew Saturday comes off as rough but loves Zak, Drew Monday acts sweetly but hates Zak. Her sword shoots ice instead of fire like her counterpart.

Fiskerton Monday
 Voice Actor: Diedrich Bader

Fiskerton Monday has horns in place of ears and is much more vicious than his counterpart.

Komodo Monday
 Voice Actor: Fred Tatasciore impersonating George Sanders

Komodo Monday is capable of human speech and seems to be the leader of the group, when they're not fighting amongst themselves. He possesses black spots on his back which he can expand to cover his entire body and harden his skin.

Zon Monday
 Voice Actor: Fred Tatasciore

Zon Monday has eye-like patterns on her wings, but otherwise behaves almost exactly like Zon Saturday.

Kur
Kur is an ancient cryptid said to be a source of unlimited power and immortality for whoever can find and capture it, with the first season focusing on it due to its ability to control all other cryptids. The Saturdays and Argost are eventually led to Antarctica by Fiskerton, where they discover an ancient behemoth frozen in the ice. Believing this was the creature he sought, Argost took control of the cryptid from the inside and commanded its army of cryptid parasites, forcing Zak and Fiskerton to follow him into it. While inside, Zak's powers seemed to be stronger than ever and after a lengthy battle, he used his powers to bring down the behemoth that was believed to be Kur.

However, the actual Kur is revealed to be Zak as a result of the mystic energies infused in Zak while he was in the womb. With the added revelation that any attempt to remove the Kur spirit would kill him, Zak became targeted by various parties who would use his powers to their ends. One among them was Argost before he learned of Zak Monday and absorbed the Anti-Kur spirit, though Argost's greed got the better of them when he absorbed the Kur spirit from Zak. Because the two Kur spirits are within one body, Argost implodes from the strain with both spirits seemingly destroyed. However, as revealed in the Ben 10: Omniverse series, Argost was revealed to have actually been thrown into a state of anti-matter flux with Kur's powers eventually returning to Zak once the flux ends.

Eterno
 Voice Actor: Fred Tatasciore

Eterno is the Salt Man that appears in "Eterno". He was once an ancient warrior king, whose thirst for conquest could not be quenched. He also attempts to find the Methuselah Tree (a tree that makes all the water on Earth). He, however, failed and was instead entombed in salt by the tree's protectors, who resemble giant purple centipedes. As time passed, he became pure salt, but was awakened by water that touched him. After his awakening, he begins to turn the oceans into salt. Touching anything or anyone with his right hand will turn them to salt, but his left hand doesn't appear to have an effect. The Methuselah Tree is the only thing that is immune to his touch.

He turns the rivers of the Middle East into salt and has trapped all of the villagers (which are the Hassi who are guardians of the Mother River, the supposed source of all the water on Earth) in shells of salt, including their Chief (Maboul). He also trapped Drew in a likewise salt shell. He makes a deal for Zak to get the sap from the tree and bring it to him and he'll turn everyone back to the way they were. He also tried to attack Zak, Wadi, and Fiskerton when they were searching for the tree, but left. Doc fought him for turning his wife into salt and Eterno turned his left leg into salt. Even when smashing Eterno into pieces, he forms himself back (saying he is eternal, while Doc states that nobody lives forever).

The tree's protectors arrived (with Zak controlling them) and he accidentally dropped a bottle that had the sap in it. Wadi also took one of the flowers from the tree and it made the protectors angry. Wadi throws it to Zak and he tries to get all of the victims turn back to normal, but Eterno turns the protectors to salt and snatches the flower from Zak and drinks the sap. Zak and Doc try to stop him, but it was too late. Eterno lets out a satisfied "Ah!" as his body crumbles into pieces of salt, his thirst finally quenched.

Ron Bantington
 Voice Actor: Jeff Bennett

Ron Bantington is the head of Bantington Industrial who is seen in "Kur". He was the biggest corporate sponsor of TV's Weird World, while also being involved in many illegal activities. Doyle tracked him down to a restaurant in London, England to see if Bantington knew any evidence of Argost. Bantington tells Doyle that he's a sponsor and apparently doesn't make the show. Doyle asked Baintington if he's trying to tell him that bad guys never really 'pal' around together. Ron said that he doesn't know where Argost has disappeared to, but wished he knew because Argost is his 'biggest money-maker' and said he knew one thing: his kind of people do like to 'pal' around together. He and his gang all tried to stop Doyle, but he and Zon managed to defeat him and his minions.

Gokul
 Voice actor: Corey Burton

A magician from India who can create illusions and summon images into the minds of his enemies. His group of people, long ago, performed a ritual that would defeat Kur. He lured the Saturdays by using an illusion of a young girl. He involves to help the Saturdays to destroy Kur if they could get the Flute of Gilgamesh from the Nagas. Once they got the flute and head to the ceremony, Gokul uses it and the flute begins to drain Zak's powers. However, it was revealed midway that driving Kur's spirit out of Zak will kill him, since he is Kur himself rather than someone possessed. Gokul tells them that Kur's powers were too great, angering the Saturdays. The Secret Scientists and the Nagas arrive to save him from being killed.

Gokul makes illusions of stone walls, but the Saturdays and the Scientists knew that the walls were nothing more than an illusion. However, the images Gokul creates next are a mixture of both reality and illusion, but Deadbolt is able to tell the difference. Once Deadbolt makes through the maze, he tries to save Zak, but Gokul destroys him by throwing a large spear. Gokul then creates an illusion of a gigantic hawk that scares the Nagas away, but Rani Nagi doesn't flee. Gokul then creates an illusion of fire, but the Saturdays, the Scientists, and Rani Nagi save Zak from being killed. Gokul then gives up and escapes.

Michel Grosshomme
 Voice Actor: Brian George

An overweight man who is the biggest illegal cryptid trader on the Earth. He only appears in "The Return of Tsul Kalu". Baron Finster told Doyle, Van Rook, and Zon to follow the cryptids. Doyle, Van Rook, and Zon tracked him at the Black Market of Morocco to see if he knows anything about Argost's past. Once the guards were defeated, they find several cryptids in cages and tanks (Zon was interested in eating the aquatic sea scorpion-like cryptids).

Grosshomme was in his office (with three cryptids) and having some "exquisite" dumplings. Van Rook and Doyle caught him. Once Doyle tried one of the dumplings, he said it tasted good and asked what it was made of. Abbey arrived and tells him that the dumplings were made out of a panda bear. Doyle spat the dumpling out and yells at Grosshomme for eating something made out of an endangered animal. While Grosshomme was eating more of his dumplings, Argost and Munya arrived and Grosshomme becomes terrified (even when Abbey said she could deliver him). Zon arrives and attacks Argost, Munya, and Abbey while Doyle creates a cloud of smoke from his jetpack.

Doyle and Van Rook tell Grosshomme to come with them if he wants to live, then asks him if he knows about Argost's past. However, three cryptids escaped and Grosshomme forced Doyle to take them with him because they're apparently worth a fortune. While they were hiding, Grosshomme was eating a kabob and the fish cryptid escaped. Once Doyle defeats Abbey and gets the fish cryptid back, he sees Zon and Van Rook fighting Munya and Grosshomme was on a roof of a building with the two primate cryptids and Argost was about to take one of them, but Doyle kicks Argost off the roof. Doyle tells Grosshomme to quit playing "zookeeper" and tells him to set the cryptids loose if he wants to eat another kabob, in which Grosshomme then releases them. Doyle then tells Van Rook and Zon to fly Grosshomme to safety while he holds off Argost. As Zon and Van Rook quickly fly Grosshomme to safety, Argost's actual target is the orange primate cryptid.

Dr. Lee
 Voice Actor:''' Diedrich Bader

A villainous scientist who is a colleague of Basil Lancaster and young Doc Saturday in a project to create cryptids within Honey Island Swamp. When the project went out of control, Dr. Lancaster betrayed him and the other three scientists by destroying enough of their research to cripple the project, saved the cryptids, and fled into the bayou. Years later, they used technology to create a ghost of the late Basil Lancaster to lure the Saturdays to Honey Island Swamp and use "Basil's ghost" to make Doc restart the project. Dr. Lee and his men then knock out Zak, Fiskerton, and Komodo with sleeping gas and abduct them so they could place them in a machine to mutate them. Once the machine was activated, the three Saturdays were fused together into a monstrous cryptid: the Zakermodo/Saturday Hybrid.

When Doc and Drew confronted Dr. Lee and his men, they revealed that they turned their boys into a cryptid. Drew tried to get their attention, but Dr. Lee explained that there are three brains in one head trying to work together and it makes them confused. Doc grabs Dr. Lee and threatens him with his glove while telling him to fix his dirty work. Dr. Lee said he would if Doc will agree to continue the project. However, the two refused and Drew said that they will figure out the machine, but Doc told Drew if the machine gets damaged, the boys could be stuck that way forever. Soon, the 13 cryptids that were created by the machine years ago, arrive when they hear the Zakermodo screaming and destroy the machine. Dr. Lee becomes frightened and ordered the cryptids to stay away, since he and the other scientists made them. However, the cryptids would not listen and the Zakermodo breaks free. When Doc and Drew head to the swamp to catch him, four of the cryptids pull the two away as the Lake Worth Monster grabs the Saturday Hybrid, believing he's one of them. However, when the cryptid heard Drew calling out her son's name, he releases him, heads to one of the cabins and reveals a photo of young Doc and Dr. Lancaster and a message recorded in a radio.

When the Saturdays and the cryptids head back to the lab, the machine wasn't damaged and Dr. Lee was forced to turn the Saturday Hybrid back to normal. After the boys returned to normal and hear the message from Lancaster, the Saturdays and the cryptids destroy the machine and all that remains of the project. Dr. Lee and the three scientists were then handed over the U.S. Army with proof of their illegal experiments pinned to their bound appearance.

See also
 List of The Secret Saturdays episodes

References

Lists of characters in American television animation
Cartoon Network Studios characters
Television characters introduced in 2008
Episodes
2000s television-related lists